Football is a 1982 Indian Malayalam-language film directed by Radhakrishnan and written by Shyam Krishna from a story by P. P. Subair. The film stars Nedumudi Venu and Zarina Wahab in the lead roles. The film has musical score by Johnson.

Plot

Cast
Nedumudi Venu
Zarina Wahab
Maniyanpilla Raju
Mohanlal
Ravishankar
Anu

Soundtrack
The music was composed by Johnson and the lyrics were written by Shyam Krishna, Poovachal Khader and Anwar Suber.

References

External links
 

1982 films
1980s Malayalam-language films
Films shot in Thrissur